Panca is best known as a genus of butterflies - Panca (butterfly) but also:

 P-ANCA - Perinuclear Anti-Neutrophil Cytoplasmic Antibodies
 Pânca, Bucerdea Grânoasă a village in Romania
 Panka, Ukraine, a village in Ukraine
 Panca (artist) AKA Paola Villaseñor an American muralist
 Panca, a Spanish alternative spelling of the native Filipino bangka (boat)
 Ají panca, Peruvian chilli pepper